Husayn Ali Jum'ah (born 4 September 1949) is a Syrian literary scholar and poet, known for his studies on classical Arabic literature and headed Arab Writers Union from 2005 until 2011.

Biography and career 

Hussein Ali Jumaa was born in Yabroud north of Damascus on 4 September 1949 and grew up in the Damascene Al-Nawfara neighborhood near the Umayyad Mosque. He obtained his high school diploma in the city of Damascus in 1967, then joined the Institute of Teachers’ Preparation and obtained his certificate before joining the Faculty of Arts at the University of Damascus to obtain a Bachelor’s degree in Arabic in 1978, then a Postgraduate Diploma and then a Master’s. He received his PhD in Arts from Damascus University in 1987, then joined the Arab Writers Union in the early 1990s.

He was a principal of the "Khair al-Din al-Zarkali" secondary school from 1977 to 1984. He was appointed as professor of classical Arabic literature at the University of Damascus, since 1983, and at the Qatar University in the Faculty of Humanities during 1992 to 1997. He started fiction writing in 1982, and then changed to non-fiction in his writings. He was appointed president of the Arab Writers Union on 4 September 2005, succeeding Ali Uqla Arsan, who had headed it since 1977. In 2011 he was replaced by Ghassan Wannous. He has been criticized for his political views. In July 2011, an Egyptian writer, Magdy Yusuf, denounced him as the head of the Writers Union for his support of what Yusuf described as “the repression and killing of peaceful Syrian demonstrators by the Syrian regime”.

Bibliography 
His literature-related books:
 , 1989 
 , 1990 
 , 1990
 , 1991/1998
 , 1992/2006
 , 1992-1993
 , 2002 
 , 2003
 , 2003
 , 2003 
 , 2005
 , 2005
 , 2006
 , 2008
 , 2009
 , 2002
 , 2002
 , 2010
 , 2012
 , 2013
 , 2013
 , 2013  
 , 2013  
 , 2018 
 , 2019 
 , 2019 
Non-literary:
 , 2006
 , 2007
 , 2009
 , 2011
 , 2012  
 , 2012 
 , 2012  
 , 2014 
 , 2014  
 , 2015 
 , 2016 
 , 2018  
Poetry collections:
 , 2015
  , 2015
  , 2015
  , 2015
  , 2015
  , 2016
  , 2016
  , 2016
  , 2017
  , 2017

References 

1949 births
Living people
Damascus University alumni
Academic staff of Damascus University
20th-century Syrian writers
21st-century Syrian poets
Syrian non-fiction writers
Syrian literary critics
People from Rif Dimashq Governorate